Geir Sveinsson (born 27 January 1964) is an Icelandic handball coach and former player who competed in the 1988 Summer Olympics and in the 1992 Summer Olympics.

He was hired as the head coach of Akureyri Handboltafélag in January 2019. In August the same year, he was hired as the head coach of HSG Nordhorn-Lingen.

In 2022, he was hired as the mayor of Hveragerði.

References

1964 births
Living people
Geir Sveinsson
Geir Sveinsson
Handball players at the 1988 Summer Olympics
Handball players at the 1992 Summer Olympics
Expatriate handball players
Geir Sveinsson
Geir Sveinsson
Geir Sveinsson
Geir Sveinsson
Liga ASOBAL players
BM Granollers players
Montpellier Handball players
Geir Sveinsson
Geir Sveinsson